This article lists those who were potential candidates for the Democratic nomination for Vice President of the United States in the 2004 election. Massachusetts Senator John Kerry won the 2004 Democratic nomination for President of the United States, and chose North Carolina Senator John Edwards as his running mate on July 6, 2004. The Kerry–Edwards ticket would go on to lose the 2004 election to the Bush–Cheney ticket.

Selection
One of the major criteria considered to be a factor in selecting a vice-presidential candidate was the ability to deliver a traditionally Republican or a swing state in the November election. Every successful Democratic presidential campaign since 1960 had included a politician from a swing state (usually in the South) who helped deliver one or more states for the Democrats. As of late June, the charismatic Edwards was the first choice of Democratic voters, according to several polls; some pundits attributed this to high name recognition, due to his runner-up status in the primaries.

Reported Shortlist 
Pundits and those close to the Kerry campaign indicated that the vice-presidential selection had narrowed to five potential choices.

Announcement 
On the morning of July 6, 2004, Kerry announced the selection of John Edwards as his running mate. However, at 10 p.m. on the night before the official announcement, the information was leaked by an airport worker who saw Edwards's name being painted on Kerry's plane, which was to be used to announce his choice of running mate. On July 6, the Kerry campaign sent an e-mail message to his supporters at about 8:15 a.m. EDT informing them of the choice, and made the formal announcement for 9 a.m. EDT in Pittsburgh, Pennsylvania.

Media speculation on possible vice presidential candidates

Members of Congress 
Governors

Federal executive branch officials

Other individuals

See also
John Kerry 2004 presidential campaign
2004 Democratic Party presidential primaries
2004 Democratic National Convention
2004 United States presidential election
List of United States major party presidential tickets

References

John Kerry 2004 presidential campaign
John Kerry
John Edwards
Vice presidency of the United States
Hillary Clinton
Joe Biden
Evan Bayh
Mark Warner